Günther Danne (born 1 November 1942) is a German former sports shooter. He competed in the 50 metre running target event at the 1972 Summer Olympics for West Germany, where he came in 7th with a total score of 551.

References

1942 births
Living people
German male sport shooters
Olympic shooters of West Germany
Shooters at the 1972 Summer Olympics
Sportspeople from Hanover